Daring Greatly is a 2012 self-help book written by Brené Brown. It is a New York Times bestseller and covers topics of vulnerability and shame.

Synopsis

The title of the book is taken from the 1910 speech Citizenship in a Republic by Theodore Roosevelt, in which he stated, "who at the best knows in the end the triumph of high achievement, and who at the worst, if he fails, at least fails while daring greatly." In the book, Brown equates vulnerability with being something hard to do and that we need to "dare greatly" in order to overcome that vulnerability. The book describes feelings of shame and unworthiness and how people have a hard time admitting they are doing certain things. It also talks about owning and engaging in vulnerability and shame resilience.

Reception 
A review from Kirkus praised the book, describing it as "[a] straightforward approach to revamping one's life from an expert on vulnerability". A Publishers Weekly review also stated that the book's main message is "understanding the difference between guilt and shame". The book was also commercially well-received, and was a New York Times bestseller.

References

External links 
 Daring Greatly book page

2012 non-fiction books
Gotham Books books